The 1996–97 Bundesliga was the 34th season of the Bundesliga, Germany's premier football league. It began on 16 August 1996 and ended on 31 May 1997. Borussia Dortmund were the defending champions.

Competition modus
Every team played two games against each other team, one at home and one away. Teams received three points for a win and one point for a draw. If two or more teams were tied on points, places were determined by goal difference and, if still tied, by goals scored. The team with the most points were crowned champions while the three teams with the fewest points were relegated to 2. Bundesliga.

Team changes to 1995–96
1. FC Kaiserslautern, Eintracht Frankfurt and KFC Uerdingen 05 were relegated to the 2. Bundesliga after finishing in the last three places. They were replaced by VfL Bochum, Arminia Bielefeld and MSV Duisburg.

Season overview

Team overview

League table

Results

Top goalscorers
22 goals
  Ulf Kirsten (Bayer 04 Leverkusen)

21 goals
  Toni Polster (1. FC Köln)

19 goals
  Fredi Bobic (VfB Stuttgart)

17 goals
  Sean Dundee (Karlsruher SC)
  Giovane Élber (VfB Stuttgart)
  Paulo Sérgio (Bayer 04 Leverkusen)
  Bernhard Winkler (TSV 1860 Munich)

15 goals
  Andreas Herzog (SV Werder Bremen)
  Jürgen Klinsmann (FC Bayern Munich)

14 goals
  Jonathan Akpoborie (F.C. Hansa Rostock)
  Stefan Kuntz (Arminia Bielefeld)

Champion squad

See also
 1996–97 2. Bundesliga
 1996–97 DFB-Pokal

References

External links
 DFB Bundesliga archive 1996/1997

Bundesliga seasons
1
Germany